Leviprora is a genus of marine ray-finned fishes belonging to the family Platycephalidae, the flatheads. These fishes are endemic to the waters of southwestern Australia.

Taxonomy
Leviprora was first proposed as a monotypic genus in 1931 by the Australian ichthyologist Gilbert Percy Whitley. Whitley designated Platycephalus inops, which had been described by Leonard Jenyns in 1840 from Western Australia, as its type species. This genus is classified within the family Playtcephalidae, the flatheads which the 5th edition of Fishes of the World classifies within the suborder Platycephaloidei in the order Scorpaeniformes. The genus name Leviprora is a compound of levis, meaning “smooth”, and prora, which means “prow”, thought to be an allusion to the absence of exposed bony ridges on upper surface of skull in L. inops.

Species
There are two recognised species within the genus Leviprora:

 Leviprora inops Jenyns, 1840 (Longhead flathead)
 Leviprora semermis De Vis, 1883 (Semi-armed flathead)

For a long time L. semermis was considered to be a junior synonym of  L. inops but it is now considered a valid species.

Distribution and habitat
Leviprora flatheads are endemic to southwestern Australia where they are found from Shark Bay in Western Australia to Point Dover and Kangaroo Island in the Great Australian Bight in South Australia.

References

 
Platycephalidae
Taxa named by Gilbert Percy Whitley
Ray-finned fish genera